The Brute is a lost 1914 early silent feature film directed by Thomas N. Heffron and starring stage actor Malcolm Williams. It was produced by Adolph Zukor and Daniel Frohman. The film was released on a State Rights basis.

Cast
Malcolm Williams - Donald Rogers 'The Brute'
Helen Hilton - Edith Pope
House Peters - Billy West
Mary Moore - Alice Pope
Camilla Dalberg - Mrs. Pope (*as Madam Dahlberg)
William Vaughn - Emerson Hall (*see Wilhelm von Brincken)
Jack Darling - Bobbie Rogers

See also
List of Paramount Pictures films

References

External links

1914 films
Films directed by Thomas N. Heffron
Films based on American novels
Famous Players-Lasky films
Lost American films
American silent feature films
American black-and-white films
1910s American films